International Breweries plc is a brewery in Nigeria.  It began production in December 1978 with an installed capacity of 200 000 hectolitres per annum, this increased to 500 000 hl/a in December 1982.

On 26 April 1994 International Breweries plc became  a  public  limited liability company and listed on the Nigerian Stock Exchange.

International Breweries plc has a technical services agreement with Brauhaase International Management GMBH, a subsidiary of Warsteiner Group of Germany, which owned 72.03% equity.

On 1 January 2012, SABMiller took operational management control of International Breweries from BGI Castel.In early 2022, International Breweries plc signed a sponsorship deal with the Nigeria Professional Football League via the Hero lager beer brand.

Products
 Trophy lager (1978), a pale lager
 Betamalt (1988), a non-alcoholic malt drink
 Mayor lager, (Now out of production)
 Trophy Black (2013), a dark lager
 Budweiser (2018)
 Hero Lager
 Eagle Lager
 Eagle Stout
 Trophy Bottle

See also
 List of beer and breweries in Nigeria

References

Breweries in Nigeria
SABMiller
Osun State
Food and drink companies established in 1971
Companies listed on the Nigerian Stock Exchange
Nigerian companies established in 1971